Franz Schubert's compositions of 1827 are mostly in the Deutsch catalogue (D) range D 896–936, and include:
 Instrumental works:
 Piano Trio No. 2, D 929
 Fantasy for violin and piano, D 934
 Impromptus, D 899 and 935
 Vocal music:
 Der Graf von Gleichen, D 918
 Winterreise, D 911
 "Ständchen", D 920

Table

Legend

List

|-
| 896
| 896
| data-sort-value="ZZZZ" |
| data-sort-value="ZZZZ" |
| data-sort-value="414,00" | IV, 14
| data-sort-value="Frohliches Scheiden" | Fröhliches Scheiden
| data-sort-value="text Gar frohlich kann ich scheiden" | Gar fröhlich kann ich scheiden
| data-sort-value="1827-09-21" | fall 1827–early 1828
| data-sort-value="Text by Leitner, Karl Gottfried von, Gar frohlich kann ich scheiden" | Text by Leitner; Sketch
|-
| data-sort-value="999.08961" |
| data-sort-value="896.1" | 896A
| data-sort-value="ZZZZ" |
| data-sort-value="ZZZZ" |
| data-sort-value="414,00" | IV, 14
| Sie in jedem Liede
| data-sort-value="text Nehm ich die Harfe" | Nehm ich die Harfe
| data-sort-value="1827-09-21" | fall 1827–early 1828
| data-sort-value="Text by Leitner, Karl Gottfried von, Nehm ich die Harfe" | Text by Leitner; Sketch
|-
| data-sort-value="999.08962" |
| data-sort-value="896.2" | 896B
| data-sort-value="ZZZZ" |
| data-sort-value="ZZZZ" |
| data-sort-value="414,00" | IV, 14
| Wolke und Quelle
| data-sort-value="text Auf meinen heimischen Bergen" | Auf meinen heimischen Bergen
| data-sort-value="1827-09-21" | fall 1827–early 1828
| data-sort-value="Text by Leitner, Karl Gottfried von, Auf meinen heimischen Bergen" | Text by Leitner; Sketch
|-
| 897
| 897
| data-sort-value="148,1846-0" | 148p(1846)
| data-sort-value="0702,005" | VII, 2No. 5
| data-sort-value="607,04" | VI, 7 No. 4
| Notturno (Piano Trio, D 897)
| data-sort-value="key E-flat major" | E major
| data-sort-value="1828-01-01" | 1828?
| Adagio
|-
| 898
| 898
| data-sort-value="099,1836-0" | 99p(1836)
| data-sort-value="0702,003" | VII, 2No. 3
| data-sort-value="607,03" | VI, 7 No. 3
| Piano Trio No. 1
| data-sort-value="key B-flat major" | B major
| data-sort-value="1828-01-01" | 1828?
| Allegro moderato – Andante un poco mosso – Scherzo – Rondo
|-
| 899
| 899
| data-sort-value="090,1827-0" | 90(1827)(1857)
| data-sort-value="1100,002" | XI No. 2
| data-sort-value="725,05" | VII/2, 5 & Anh.
| Impromptus Nos. 1–4
| data-sort-value="key C minor" | C minor – E major – G major – A major
| data-sort-value="1827-06-21" | summer–fall 1827?
| For piano; Nos. 1–2 publ. 1827
|-
| 900
| 900
| data-sort-value="XXX,1897" | (1897)
| data-sort-value="2103,016" | XXI, 3No. 16
| data-sort-value="725,61" | VII/2, 5 Anh.
| Allegretto, D 900
| data-sort-value="key C minor" | C minor
| data-sort-value="1821-01-01" | 1821 orlater?
| For piano; Fragment
|-
| 901
| 901
| data-sort-value="XXX,1827" | (1827)
| data-sort-value="1600,037" | XVINo. 37
| data-sort-value="304,58" | III, 4No. 58
| Wein und Liebe
| data-sort-value="text Liebchen und der Saft der Reben" | Liebchen und der Saft der Reben
| data-sort-value="1827-05-31" | beforeJune 1827
| data-sort-value="Text by Haug, Friedrich, Liebchen und der Saft der Reben"| Text by Haug; For ttbb
|-
| 902
| 902
| data-sort-value="083,1827-0" | 83(1827)
| data-sort-value="2010,579" | XX, 10Nos.579–581
| data-sort-value="404,00" | IV, 4
| data-sort-value="Gesange, 3" | Drei Gesänge: 1. L'incanto degli occhi (Die Macht der Augen) – 2. Il traditor deluso (Der getäuschte Verräter) – 3. Il modo di prender moglie (Die Art ein Weib zu nehmen)
| data-sort-value="text Da voi, cari lumi 2" | 1. Da voi, cari lumi (Nur euch, schöne Sterne) – 2.  Ahimè, io tremo! (Weh mir, ich bebe!) – 3. Orsù! non ci pensiamo (Wohlan! und ohne Zagen)
| data-sort-value="1827-08-31" | 1827(beforeSeptember)
| Text by Metastasio, from Attilio Regolo II, 5 (No. 1,) and Gioas re di Giuda II (No. 2); For b and piano
|-
| 903
| 903
| data-sort-value="081,1827-3" | 81,3(1827)
| data-sort-value="1600,011" | XVINo. 11
| data-sort-value="303,37" | III, 3 No. 37IV, 4
| Zur guten Nacht
| data-sort-value="text Horch auf! Es schlagt die Stunde" | Horch auf! Es schlägt die Stunde
| data-sort-value="1827-01-01" | January1827
| data-sort-value="Text by Rochlitz, Johann Friedrich, Horch auf! Es schlagt die Stunde" | Text by Rochlitz; For vocal soloist, TTBB and piano
|-
| 904
| 904
| data-sort-value="081,1827-1" | 81,1(1827)
| data-sort-value="2004,287" | XX, 4No. 287
| data-sort-value="404,00" | IV, 4
| Alinde
| data-sort-value="text Die Sonne sinkt ins tiefe Meer" | Die Sonne sinkt ins tiefe Meer
| data-sort-value="1827-01-01" | January1827
| data-sort-value="Text by Rochlitz, Johann Friedrich, Die Sonne sinkt ins tiefe Meer" | Text by Rochlitz
|-
| 905
| 905
| data-sort-value="081,1827-2" | 81,2(1827)
| data-sort-value="2004,288" | XX, 4No. 288
| data-sort-value="404,00" | IV, 4
| An die Laute
| data-sort-value="text Leiser, leiser, kleine Laute" | Leiser, leiser, kleine Laute
| data-sort-value="1827-01-01" | January1827
| data-sort-value="Text by Rochlitz, Johann Friedrich, Leiser, leiser, kleine Laute" | Text by Rochlitz
|-
| 906
| 906
| data-sort-value="XXX,1832" | (1832)
| data-sort-value="2008,514" | XX, 8No. 514
| data-sort-value="414,00" | IV, 14
| Der Vater mit dem Kind
| data-sort-value="text Dem Vater liegt das kind in Arm" | Dem Vater liegt das kind in Arm
| data-sort-value="1827-01-01" | January1827
| data-sort-value="Text by Bauernfeld, Eduard von, Dem Vater liegt das kind in Arm" | Text by Bauernfeld
|-
| 907
| 907
| data-sort-value="086,1828-0" | 86(1828)(1979)
| data-sort-value="2008,501" | XX, 8No. 501
| data-sort-value="404,00" | IV, 4
| data-sort-value="Romanze des Richard Lowenherz" | Romanze des Richard Löwenherz
| data-sort-value="text Grosser Taten tat der Ritter fern im heiligen Lande viel" | Großer Taten tat der Ritter fern im heiligen Lande viel
| data-sort-value="1826-03-01" | March1826?
|-
| 908
| 908
| data-sort-value="082,1827-1" | 82,1(1827)
| data-sort-value="0902,017" | IX, 2No. 17
| data-sort-value="713,01" | VII/1, 3 No. 1Anh. No. 1
| data-sort-value="Variations, 08, on a theme from Herold's Marie" | Eight Variations on a theme from Hérold's Marie
| data-sort-value="key C major" | C major
| data-sort-value="1827-02-01" | February1827
| For piano duet
|-
| 909
| 909
| data-sort-value="096,1828-2" | 96,2(1828)
| data-sort-value="2008,515" | XX, 8No. 515
| data-sort-value="405,00" | IV, 5
| data-sort-value="Jagers Liebeslied" | Jägers Liebeslied
| data-sort-value="text Ich schiess' den Hirsch im grunen Forst" | Ich schieß' den Hirsch im grünen Forst
| data-sort-value="1827-02-01" | February1827
| data-sort-value="Text by Schober, Franz von, Ich schiess' den Hirsch im grunen Forst" | Text by Schober
|-
| 910
| 910
| data-sort-value="XXX,1833" | (1833)
| data-sort-value="2008,516" | XX, 8No. 516
| data-sort-value="414,00" | IV, 14
| Schiffers Scheidelied
| data-sort-value="text Die Wogen am Gestade schwellen" | Die Wogen am Gestade schwellen
| data-sort-value="1827-02-01" | February1827
| data-sort-value="Text by Schober, Franz von, Die Wogen am Gestade schwellen" | Text by Schober
|-
| 911
| 911
| data-sort-value="089,1828-0" | 89(1828)
| data-sort-value="2009,553" | XX, 9Nos.517–540
| data-sort-value="404,00" | IV, 4
| data-sort-value="Winterreise" | Winterreise:—Part I—1. Gute Nacht – 2. Die Wetterfahne – 3. Gefror'ne Tränen – 4. Erstarrung – 5. Der Lindenbaum – 6. Wasserflut – 7. Auf dem Flusse – 8. Rückblick – 9. Irrlicht – 10. Rast – 11. Frühlingstraum – 12. Einsamkeit—Part II—13. Die Post – 14. Der greise Kopf – 15. Die Krähe – 16. Letzte Hoffnung – 17. Im Dorfe – 18. Der stürmische Morgen – 19. Täuschung – 20. Der Wegweiser – 21. Das Wirtshaus – 22. Mut – 23. Die Nebensonnen – 24. Der Leiermann
| data-sort-value="text Fremd bin ich eingezogen" | —Part I—1. Fremd bin ich eingezogen – 2. Der Wind spielt mit der Wetterfahne – 3. Gefror'ne Tropfen fallen – 4. Ich such' im Schnee vergebens – 5. Am Brunnen vor dem Tore – 6. Manche Trän' aus meinen Augen – 7. Der du so lustig rauschtest – 8. Es brennt mir unter beiden Sohlen – 9. In die tiefsten Felsengründe – 10. Nun merk' ich erst, wie müd ich bin – 11. Ich träumte von bunten Blumen – 12. Wie eine trübe Wolke—Part II—13. Von der Straße her ein Posthorn klingt – 14. Der Reif hat einen weißen Schein – 15. Eine Krähe war mit mir aus der Stadt gezogen – 16. Hie und da ist an den Bäumen – 17. Es bellen die Hunde – 18. Wie hat der Sturm zerrissen – 19. Ein Licht tanzt freundlich vor mir her – 20. Was vermeid' ich denn die Wege – 21. Auf einen Totenacker hat mich mein Weg gebracht – 22. Fliegt der Schnee mir ins Gesicht – 23. Drei Sonnen sah ich – 24. Drüben hinterm Dorfe steht ein Leiermann
| data-sort-value="1827-10-01" | February1827(Part Istarted);October1827(Part IIstarted)
| data-sort-value="Text by Muller, Wilhelm Winterreise" | Text by Müller, W.; Two versions for Nos. 7, 10, 11, 22 and 23; Music of No. 19 partly based on  No. 11
|-
| 912
| 912
| data-sort-value="151,1845-0" | 151p(1845)
| data-sort-value="1600,028" | XVINo. 28
| data-sort-value="304,59" | III, 4No. 59
| Schlachtlied, D 912
| data-sort-value="text Mit unserm Arm ist nichts getan 2" | Mit unserm Arm ist nichts getan
| data-sort-value="1827-02-28" | 28/2/1827
| data-sort-value="Text by Klopstock, Friedrich Gottlieb from Oden, Mit unserm Arm ist nichts getan 2" | Text by Klopstock, from Oden; For TTBBTTBB
|-
| 913
| 913
| data-sort-value="139,1846-2" | 139pII(1846)
| data-sort-value="1600,001" | XVINo. 1
| data-sort-value="301,00" | III, 1
| Nachtgesang im Walde
| data-sort-value="text Sei uns stets gegrusst, o Nacht!" | Sei uns stets gegrüßt, o Nacht!
| data-sort-value="1827-04-01" | April 1827
| data-sort-value="Text by Seidl, Johann Gabriel, Sei uns stets gegrusst, o Nacht!" | Text by Seidl; For ttbb and four horns
|-
| 914
| 914
| data-sort-value="XXX,1897" | (1897)
| data-sort-value="2104,036a" | XXI, 4No. 36a
| data-sort-value="304,60" | III, 4No. 60
| data-sort-value="Fruhlingslied, D 914" | Frühlingslied, D 914
| data-sort-value="text Geoffnet sind des Winters Riegel 1" | Geöffnet sind des Winters Riegel
| data-sort-value="1827-04-01" | April 1827
| data-sort-value="Text by Pollak, Aaron, Geoffnet sind des Winters Riegel 1" | Text by Pollak; Music reappears in other setting ); For ttbb
|-
| 915
| 915
| data-sort-value="XXX,1870" | (1870)
| data-sort-value="1100,012" | XI No. 12
| data-sort-value="725,04" | VII/2, 5
| Allegretto, D 915
| data-sort-value="key C minor" | C minor
| data-sort-value="1827-04-26" | 26/4/1827
| For piano
|-
| 916
| 916
| data-sort-value="XXX,1961" | (1961)
| data-sort-value="ZZZZ" |
| data-sort-value="304,94" | III, 4Anh. II No. 4
| data-sort-value="Stille Lied, Das" | Das stille Lied
| data-sort-value="text Schweige nur, susser Mund" | Schweige nur, süßer Mund
| data-sort-value="1827-05-01" | May 1827
| data-sort-value="Text by Seegemund, Johann Georg, Schweige nur, susser Mund" | Text by Seegemund; For ttbb; Sketch
|-
| data-sort-value="999.09161" |
| data-sort-value=916.1" | 916A
| data-sort-value="ZZZZ" |
| data-sort-value="ZZZZ" |
| data-sort-value="414,00" | IV, 14
| Liedentwurf, D 916A
| data-sort-value="key C major" | C major
| data-sort-value="1827-05-01" | May 1827?
| Sketch without text
|-
| data-sort-value="999.09162" |
| data-sort-value=916.2" | 916B
| data-sort-value="XXX,1978" | (1978)
| data-sort-value="ZZZZ" |
| data-sort-value="725,64" | VII/2, 5 Anh.
| Piano piece, D 916B
| data-sort-value="key C major" | C major
| data-sort-value="1827-06-21" | summer–fall 1827?
| Sketch
|-
| data-sort-value="999.09163" |
| data-sort-value=916.3" | 916C
| data-sort-value="XXX,1978" | (1978)
| data-sort-value="ZZZZ" |
| data-sort-value="725,65" | VII/2, 5 Anh.
| Piano piece, D 916C
| data-sort-value="key C minor" | C minor
| data-sort-value="1827-06-21" | summer–fall 1827?
| Sketch
|-
| 917
| 917
| data-sort-value="115,1829-1" | 115p,1(1829)
| data-sort-value="2009,543" | XX, 9No. 543
| data-sort-value="414,00" | IV, 14
| data-sort-value="Lied im Grunen, Das" | Das Lied im Grünen
| data-sort-value="text Ins Grune, ins Grune" | Ins Grüne, ins Grüne
| data-sort-value="1827-06-01" | June 1827
| data-sort-value="Text by Reil, Johann Anton Friedrich, Ins Grune, ins Grune"| Text by 
|-
| 918
| 918
| data-sort-value="XXX,1868" | (1868)(1962)
| data-sort-value="ZZZZ" |
| data-sort-value="217,00" | II, 17
| data-sort-value="Graf von Gleichen, Der" | Der Graf von Gleichen
| data-sort-value="theatre (Opera in 2 acts)" | (Opera in two acts)
| data-sort-value="1827-06-19" | started19/6/1827
|-
| 919
| 919
| data-sort-value="XXX,1897" | (1897)
| data-sort-value="2104,036b" | XXI, 4No. 36b
| data-sort-value="414,00" | IV, 14
| data-sort-value="Fruhlingslied, D 919" | Frühlingslied, D 919
| data-sort-value="text Geoffnet sind des Winters Riegel 2" | Geöffnet sind des Winters Riegel
| data-sort-value="1827-03-21" | spring1827?
| data-sort-value="Text by Pollak, Aaron, Geoffnet sind des Winters Riegel 2" | Text by Pollak; Music based on other setting 
|- id="D 920"
| data-sort-value="920" | 920921
| 920
| data-sort-value="135,1840-0" | 135p(1840)(1891)
| data-sort-value="1600,014" | XVINo. 14XVIIINo. 4
| data-sort-value="303,38" | III, 3 No. 38
| data-sort-value="Standchen, D 920" | Ständchen, D 920, a.k.a. Notturno
| data-sort-value="text Zogernd leise" | Zögernd leise
| data-sort-value="1827-07-01" | July 1827
|-
| 922
| 922
| data-sort-value="106,1828-1" | 106,1(1828)(1895)
| data-sort-value="2009,544" | XX, 9No. 544
| data-sort-value="405,00" | IV, 5
| Heimliches Lieben
| data-sort-value="text O du, wenn deine Lippen mich beruhren" | O du, wenn deine Lippen mich berühren
| data-sort-value="1827-09-01" | September1827
|-
| 923
| 923
| data-sort-value="165,1862-5" | 165p,5(1862)(1895)(1971)
| data-sort-value="2009,545" | XX, 9No. 545
| data-sort-value="302,24" | III, 2b No. 24IV, 14
| data-sort-value="Altschottische Ballade, Eine" | Eine altschottische Ballade
| data-sort-value="text Dein Schwert, wie ist’s von Blut so rot" | Dein Schwert, wie ist’s von Blut so rot
| data-sort-value="1827-09-01" | September1827
| data-sort-value="Text by Herder, Johann Gottfried after Edward, Edward from Percy's Reliques of Ancient English Poetry" | Text by Herder after "Edward, Edward" from Percy's Reliques of Ancient English Poetry; For male voice, female voice and piano; Three versions: 1st is Op. posth. 165 No. 5 – 2nd for voice and piano – 3rd publ. in 1971
|-
| 924
| 924
| data-sort-value="091,1828-0" | 91(1828)
| data-sort-value="1200,007" | XIINo. 7
| data-sort-value="727,00" | VII/2, 7a
| data-sort-value="Grazer Waltzes, 12" | Twelve Grazer Waltzes
| data-sort-value="key I" | Various keys
| data-sort-value="1827-09-01" | September1827?
| For piano
|-
| 925
| 925
| data-sort-value="XXX,1828" | (1828)
| data-sort-value="1200,024" | XIINo. 24
| data-sort-value="727,00" | VII/2, 7a
| Grazer Galopp
| data-sort-value="key C major" | C major
| data-sort-value="1827-09-01" | September1827?
| For piano
|-
| 926
| 926
| data-sort-value="106,1828-2" | 106,2(1828)
| data-sort-value="2009,546" | XX, 9No. 546
| data-sort-value="405,00" | IV, 5
| data-sort-value="Weinen, Das" | Das Weinen
| data-sort-value="text Gar trostlich kommt geronnen" | Gar tröstlich kommt geronnen
| data-sort-value="1827-09-21" | fall 1827–early 1828
| data-sort-value="Text by Leitner, Karl Gottfried von, Gar trostlich kommt geronnen" | Text by Leitner
|-
| 927
| 927
| data-sort-value="106,1828-3" | 106,3(1828)
| data-sort-value="2009,547" | XX, 9No. 547
| data-sort-value="405,00" | IV, 5
| Vor meiner Wiege
| data-sort-value="text Das also, das ist der enge Schrein" | Das also, das ist der enge Schrein
| data-sort-value="1827-09-21" | fall 1827–early 1828
| data-sort-value="Text by Leitner, Karl Gottfried von, Das also, das ist der enge Schrei" | Text by Leitner
|-
| 928
| 928
| data-sort-value="XXX,1870" | (1870)
| data-sort-value="0901,007" | IX, 1No. 7
| data-sort-value="714,07" | VII/1, 4
| March, D 928, a.k.a. Kindermarsch
| data-sort-value="key G major" | G major
| data-sort-value="1827-10-12" | 12/10/1827
| For piano duet
|-
| 929
| 929
| data-sort-value="100,1828-0" | 100(1828)(1975)
| data-sort-value="0702,004" | VII, 2No. 4
| data-sort-value="607,02" | VI, 7 No. 2& Anh.
| Piano Trio No. 2
| data-sort-value="key E-flat major" | E major
| data-sort-value="1827-11-01" | startedNov. 1827
| Allegro – Andante con moto – Scherzando – Allegro moderato; Shortened version, in AGA, is Op. 100
|-
| 930
| 930
| data-sort-value="104,1829-0" | 104p(1829)
| data-sort-value="1900,002" | XIXNo. 2
| data-sort-value="302,15" | III, 2aNo. 15
| data-sort-value="Hochzeitsbraten, Der" | Der Hochzeitsbraten
| data-sort-value="text Ach liebes Herz, ach Theobald" | Ach liebes Herz, ach Theobald
| data-sort-value="1827-11-01" | November1827
| data-sort-value="Text by Schober, Franz von, Ach liebes Herz, ach Theobald" | Text by Schober; For stb and piano
|-
| 931
| 931
| data-sort-value="XXX,1835" | (1835)
| data-sort-value="2009,548" | XX, 9No. 548
| data-sort-value="414,00" | IV, 14
| data-sort-value="Wallensteiner Lanzknecht beim Trunk, Der" | Der Wallensteiner Lanzknecht beim Trunk
| data-sort-value="text He! schenket mir im Helme ein!" | He! schenket mir im Helme ein!
| data-sort-value="1827-11-01" | November1827
| data-sort-value="Text by Leitner, Karl Gottfried von, He! schenket mir im Helme ein!" | Text by Leitner
|-
| 932
| 932
| data-sort-value="XXX,1832" | (1832)
| data-sort-value="2009,549" | XX, 9No. 549
| data-sort-value="414,00" | IV, 14
| data-sort-value="Kreuzzug, Der" | Der Kreuzzug
| data-sort-value="text Ein Munich steht in seiner Zell" | Ein Münich steht in seiner Zell
| data-sort-value="1827-11-01" | November1827
| data-sort-value="Text by Leitner, Karl Gottfried von, Ein Munich steht in seiner Zell" | Text by Leitner
|-
| 933
| 933
| data-sort-value="XXX,1835" | (1835)
| data-sort-value="2009,550" | XX, 9No. 550
| data-sort-value="414,00" | IV, 14
| data-sort-value="Fischers Liebesgluck, Des" | Des Fischers Liebesglück
| data-sort-value="text Dort blinket durch Weiden" | Dort blinket durch Weiden
| data-sort-value="1827-11-01" | November1827
| data-sort-value="Text by Leitner, Karl Gottfried von, Dort blinket durch Weiden" | Text by Leitner
|-
| 934
| 934
| data-sort-value="159,1850-0" | 159p(1850)
| data-sort-value="0800,005" | VIIINo. 5
| data-sort-value="608,08" | VI, 8 No. 8
| Fantasy, D 934
| data-sort-value="key C major" | C major
| data-sort-value="1827-12-01" | December1827
| For violin and piano; Reuses music of 
|-
| 935
| 935
| data-sort-value="142,1839-0" | 142p(1839)
| data-sort-value="1100,003" | XI No. 3
| data-sort-value="725,06" | VII/2, 5 & Anh.
| Impromptus Nos. 5–8
| data-sort-value="key F minor" | F minor – A major – B major – F minor
| data-sort-value="1827-12-01" | December1827
| For piano; 7th Impromptu reuses music of 
|-
| 936
| 936
| data-sort-value="XXX,1892" | (1892)
| data-sort-value="1700,015" | XVIINo. 15
| data-sort-value="302,16" | III, 2aNo. 16
| data-sort-value="Kantate fur Irene Kiesewetter" | Kantate für Irene Kiesewetter a.k.a. Cantate zur Feier der Genesung der Irene Kiesewetter
| data-sort-value="text Al par del ruscelletto chiaro" | Al par del ruscelletto chiaro
| data-sort-value="1827-12-26" | 26/12/1827
| for ttbbSATB and piano duet
|}

Lists of compositions by Franz Schubert
Compositions by Franz Schubert
Schubert